Apicum-Açu is a municipality in the state of Maranhão in the Northeast region of Brazil.

See also
List of municipalities in Maranhão

References

Municipalities in Maranhão
Populated coastal places in Maranhão